Nowy Jaworów  is a village in the urban-rural Gmina Jaworzyna Śląska, within Świdnica County, Lower Silesian Voivodeship, in south-western Poland. Prior to 1945 it was in Germany.

References

Villages in Świdnica County